Romans-sur-Isère (Occitan: Rumans d'Isèra; Old Occitan: Romans) is a commune in the Drôme department in southeastern France.

Geography
There are more than 50,000 inhabitants in the urban area (if the neighboring town of Bourg-de-Péage is included). Romans is close to the Vercors.

Population

Economy
 Nuclear fuel manufacture (FBFC, Franco-Belge de Fabrication du Combustible), Framatome subsidiary.
 Shoe manufacture (including Robert Clergerie)

History
Historian Emmanuel Le Roy Ladurie wrote Carnaval de Romans (1980) a microhistorical study, based on the only two surviving eyewitness accounts, of the 1580 massacre of about twenty artisans at the annual carnival in the town. He treats the massacre as a microcosm of the political, social and religious conflicts of rural society in the latter half of the 16th century in France.
On 18 July 2017, the town was the end point for Stage Sixteen of the Tour De France.
On 4 April 2020, two people were killed and five wounded in a knife attack, in what the interior minister called a terrorist incident. Prosecutors said the suspect was a Sudanese refugee in his 30s who lived in the town.

Sights
Collegiate Church of Saint-Barnard
International Museum of Footwear
Tower of Jacquemart clock

Twin towns - sister cities

Romans-sur-Isère is twinned with:

 Coalville, England, United Kingdom
 Corsano, Italy
 Straubing, Germany
 Varese, Italy
 Zadar, Croatia
 Zlín, Czech Republic

Notable people
Hippolyte Charles (1773-1837), lover of Joséphine Bonaparte
Robert Clergerie, shoe designer
Érik Comas (1963-), former Formula One driver
Pierre Latour (1993-), cyclist
Jules Nadi (1872-1928), former mayor and councilor who did much to develop the city
Baptiste Reynet, professional footballer
Philippe Saint-André, rugby player and national team coach
Thomas Arthur, Comte de Lally, general of Irish Jacobite ancestry

See also
Communes of the Drôme department
Parc naturel régional du Vercors

References

External links

 Town council website 
 Communauté de communes du Pays de Romans website
 New Uranium Leak Found in French Areva Factory
 

Communes of Drôme
Dauphiné